Depressaria assalella is a moth of the family Depressariidae. It is found in Algeria.

References

Moths described in 1915
Depressaria
Moths of Africa